Babbington Colliery, also known as Cinderhill Colliery, was a coal mine in Cinderhill, Nottinghamshire, England. The mine opened in 1841, and was the first large-scale coal mine in the county. Babbington Colliery had a long life, and did not close until 1986.

The site is now the location of a business park, and the Phoenix Park tram terminus of the Nottingham Express Transit. It lies within the current boundaries of the City of Nottingham.

The colliery was linked to the railway network by the Cinderhill Colliery Railway, part of which is now used by the Phoenix Park branch of the Nottingham Express Transit.

References

1841 establishments in England
1986 disestablishments in England
Coal mines in Nottinghamshire
Underground mines in England